Consistency, in logic, is a quality of no contradiction.

Consistency may also refer to:

Computer science
 Consistency (database systems)
 Consistency (knowledge bases)
 Consistency (user interfaces)
 Consistent hashing
 Consistent heuristic
 Consistency model
 Data consistency

Statistics
 Consistency (statistics), a property of an estimation technique giving the right answer with an infinite amount of data
 Consistent estimator
 Fisher consistency
 Consistent test: see Statistical hypothesis testing

Physics
 The viscosity of a thick fluid
 Consistency (suspension) of a suspension
 Consistent histories, in quantum mechanics

Other uses
 Consistency (negotiation), the psychological need to be consistent with prior acts and statements
 "Consistency", an 1887 speech by Mark Twain
 "Consistency", a song by Megan Thee Stallion and Jhené Aiko from the album Traumazine, 2022

 The consistency criterion, a measure of a voting system requiring that where one is elected by all segments of the voters, one must win the election
 Consistency Theory, an album by 1200 Techniques
 Consistent and inconsistent equations, in mathematics
 Consistent life ethic, an ideology stating that life is sacred
 Equiconsistency, in logic
 Mr. Consistency (foaled 1958), American Thoroughbred racehorse

See also
 Constancy (disambiguation)